Calvary is a 1525-1549 copy of a lost work by Jan van Amstel, now in the Royal Museum of Fine Arts, Antwerp, to which it was bequeathed by Florent van Ertborn in 1849. At that time it was attributed to Pieter Aertsen, though it has later also been attributed to Frans Floris and Gillis Mostaert I.

References 

Paintings in the collection of the Royal Museum of Fine Arts Antwerp
1520s paintings
1530s paintings
1540s paintings
Amstel